T. africana may refer to:
 Tabernaemontana africana, a flowering plant species in the genus Tabernaemontana
 Tieghemella africana, a plant species found in Cameroon, the Republic of the Congo and Gabon
 Tornieria africana, a dinosaur species
 Treculia africana, the African breadfruit, a tree species
 Tricalysia africana, a plant species endemic to South Africa

See also
 Africana (disambiguation)